Vsevolod Nikolaevich Shilovsky (born June 3, 1938, Moscow ) is a Soviet and Russian film and theater actor, film director, People's Artist of the RSFSR (1986). He was awarded the Order of Friendship (1997)  and the Order of Honor (January 20, 2015)'.

Biography 
Father Nikolay Shilovsky graduated from the Conservatory in composition and the Zhukovsky Air Force Engineering Academy, led the factory was the chief of station Northeast Passage Tiksi. Member of the Great Patriotic War.

During the Great Patriotic War Vsevolod with his mother were evacuated to Kazan, my mother worked in the aircraft engine plant. He graduated from the Moscow Art Theater School (course of Alexander Karev). In 1961–1987 years of combined active crew work to that of Moscow Art Theatre. Since 1987, focuses exclusively on the cinema, some films speaking also as a director. Is the head of the acting studio in Gerasimov Institute of Cinematography.

Family 
 His wife Natalia Kipriyanovna Tsekhanovskaya, harpist.
 Son: Ilya Vsevolodovich Shilovsky (born 1970), a Russian director. Granddaughter: Aglaia Ilinichna Shilovskaya (1993), actress 
 Son: Pavel Vsevolodovich Shilovsky (born 1974), a film producer.

Selected filmography 
 1977 —  Destiny  as Hans
 1977 —  Investigation Held by ZnaToKi (Следствие ведут ЗнаТоКи) as Semyon Kholin
 1981 —  Waiting for Love (Любимая женщина механика Гаврилова) as Pasha
 1982 —  Golos (Голос) as Cameraman
 1983 —  Love by Request (Влюблён по собственному желанию) as Nikolai
 1983 —  Wartime Romance (Военно-полевой роман) as Grisha
 1986 —  The Life of Klim Samgin (Жизнь Клима Самгина) as Zaкhar Petrovich Berdnikov
 1986 —  Jaguar (Ягуар) as major
 1986 —  The Prisoner of Château d'If (Узник замка Иф) as Gaspard Caderousse
 1986 —  How to Become Happy (Как стать счастливым) as editor-in-chief
 1988 —  Bright Personality (Светлая личность) as Abel Dobroglasov
 1989 —  Intergirl (Интердевочка) as Nikolay Platonovich Zaytsev
 1999 —  Kamenskaya (Каменская) as Colonel Pavlov
 2005 —  Popsa (Попса) as Efim Ilyich
 2007 —  Life Unawares (Жизнь врасплох) as Sidor Kamilovich 
 2011 —  Once Upon a Time There Lived a Simple Woman (Жила-была одна баба) as Holy Father Yeremey
 2011 —  The Life and Adventures of Mishka Yaponchik (Жизнь и приключения Мишки Япончика) as Lev Barsky
 2015 —  Song of Songs  as Melamed

References

External links

1938 births
Russian male actors
Soviet male actors
Recipients of the Order of Honour (Russia)
Honored Artists of the RSFSR
People's Artists of the RSFSR
Soviet film directors
Russian film directors
Living people
Moscow Art Theatre School alumni